An audio leveler performs an audio process similar to compression, which is used to reduce the dynamic range of a signal, so that the quietest portion of the signal is loud enough to hear and the loudest portion is not too loud. 

Levelers work especially well with vocals, as there are huge dynamic differences in the human voice and levelers work in such a way as to sound very natural, letting the character of the sound change with the different levels but still maintaining a predictable and usable dynamic range.

A leveler is different from a compressor in that the ratio and threshold are controlled with a single control.

External links 

 TLA-100 Tube Levelling Amplifier by Summit Audio

Signal processing